In mathematics, an injective function (also known as injection, or one-to-one function) is a function  that maps distinct elements of its domain to distinct elements; that is,  implies . (Equivalently,  implies  in the equivalent contrapositive statement.) In other words, every element of the function's codomain is the image of  one element of its domain. The term  must not be confused with  that refers to bijective functions, which are functions such that each element in the codomain is an image of exactly one element in the domain. 

A homomorphism between algebraic structures is a function that is compatible with the operations of the structures. However, in the more general context of category theory, the definition of a monomorphism differs from that of an injective homomorphism. This is thus a theorem that they are equivalent for algebraic structures; see  for more details.

A function  that is not injective is sometimes called many-to-one.

Definition 

Symbolically,
which is logically equivalent to the contrapositive,

Examples 
For visual examples, readers are directed to the gallery section.
 For any set  and any subset  the inclusion map  (which sends any element  to itself) is injective. In particular, the identity function  is always injective (and in fact bijective).
 If the domain of a function is  the empty set, then the function is the empty function, which is injective.
 If the domain of a function has one element (that is, it is a singleton set), then the function is always injective.

Injections can be undone 

Functions with left inverses are always injections. In this case,  is called a retraction of  Conversely,  is called a section of 

Conversely, every injection  with a non-empty domain has a left inverse .

The left inverse  is not necessarily an inverse of  because the composition in the other order,  may differ from the identity on  In other words, an injective function can be  "reversed" by a left inverse, but is not necessarily invertible, which requires that the function is bijective.

Injections may be made invertible 

In fact, to turn an injective function  into a bijective (hence invertible) function, it suffices to replace its codomain  by its actual range  That is, let  such that  for all ; then  is bijective. Indeed,  can be factored as  where  is the inclusion function from  into 

More generally, injective partial functions are called partial bijections.

Other properties 

 If  is injective, then  is injective (but  need not be).
  is injective if and only if, given any functions   whenever  then  In other words, injective functions are precisely the monomorphisms in the category Set of sets.
(This is known as the Cantor–Bernstein–Schroeder theorem.)
 An injective function which is a homomorphism between two algebraic structures is an embedding.
 Unlike surjectivity, which is a relation between the graph of a function and its codomain, injectivity is a property of the graph of the function alone; that is, whether a function  is injective can be decided by only considering the graph (and not the codomain) of

Proving that functions are injective 

A proof that a function  is injective depends on how the function is presented and what properties the function holds.
For functions that are given by some formula there is a basic idea.
We use the definition of injectivity, namely that if  then 

Here is an example: 

Proof: Let   Suppose   So  implies  which implies   Therefore, it follows from the definition that  is injective.

There are multiple other methods of proving that a function is injective.  For example, in calculus if  is a differentiable function defined on some interval, then it is sufficient to show that the derivative is always positive or always negative on that interval.  In linear algebra, if  is a linear transformation it is sufficient to show that the kernel of  contains only the zero vector.  If  is a function with finite domain it is sufficient to look through the list of images of each domain element and check that no image occurs twice on the list.

A graphical approach for a real-valued function  of a real variable  is the horizontal line test.

Gallery

See also

Notes

References 

 , p. 17 ff.
 , p. 38 ff.

External links 

 Earliest Uses of Some of the Words of Mathematics: entry on Injection, Surjection and Bijection has the history of Injection and related terms.
 Khan Academy – Surjective (onto) and Injective (one-to-one) functions: Introduction to surjective and injective functions

Functions and mappings
Basic concepts in set theory
Types of functions